Tosanoides flavofasciatus (Japanese: キシマハナダイ) is a species of reef fish native to the Pacific Ocean, specifically Sagami Bay and the Tonga-Kermadec Ridge. The males of the species can grow up to 9 centimeters while the females can grow up to 6 centimeters. It can found in depths of 40 to 50 meters.

References 

Taxa named by Masao Katayama
Taxa named by Hajime Masuda
Fish described in 1980
Fish of the Pacific Ocean
flavofasciatus